Suo Di (born 18 February 1993) is a Chinese badminton player. She won gold at the 2010 Asian Junior Championships in the girls' singles event.

Achievements

BWF World Junior Championships 
Girls' singles

Asian Junior Championships 
Girls' singles

BWF Grand Prix 
The BWF Grand Prix had two levels, the Grand Prix and Grand Prix Gold. It was a series of badminton tournaments sanctioned by the Badminton World Federation (BWF) and played between 2007 and 2017.

Women's singles

  BWF Grand Prix Gold tournament
  BWF Grand Prix tournament

References

External links 
 

1993 births
Living people
Badminton players from Jiangsu
Sportspeople from Xuzhou
Chinese female badminton players
Universiade silver medalists for China
Universiade medalists in badminton
Medalists at the 2013 Summer Universiade
21st-century Chinese women